Afromizonus is a genus of beetles in the family Carabidae, containing the following species:

 Afromizonus ruber Basilewsky, 1950
 Afromizonus tecospilus Basilewsky, 1947
 Afromizonus voltae Basilewsky, 1946

References

Harpalinae